California Speaks was a statewide deliberative forum on health care reform that took place on August 11, 2007 in eight counties in California: Humboldt, Sacramento, Alameda (Oakland), Fresno, San Luis Obispo, Los Angeles, Riverside and San Diego. Nearly 3,500 people representing all segments of the population were randomly recruited to participate in this day-long discussion of health care reform proposals that are before the California legislature.

Background

Governor Arnold Schwarzenegger of California proposed comprehensive health insurance reform for California on January 9, 2007 that would lead to nearly universal health insurance coverage in the state. The plan involved a complex set of requirements that employers provide health insurance or pay into a state insurance pool, that health care providers and insurers pay a new fee, and that all individuals be legally required to carry health insurance. The state would use the new fees to expand free or low-cost health insurance to those with low incomes, would allow higher income individuals to purchase “catastrophic” insurance, and would require insurance companies to sell insurance to any applicant (called guaranteed issue)  By mid-year, two different Democratic proposals that overlapped the Governor’s proposal had merged into Assembly Bill 8 (AB8) and were seen as the most likely health insurance expansion bill to be passed and signed by California’s governor in 2007. Another bill with substantial support in the legislature proposed a single payer system, SB840. It was similar to a bill that had passed the legislature in a previous session and been vetoed by the Governor.

Much of the organizational ideas and effort were provided by AmericaSpeaks, a group which promotes deliberation as a community method in a variety of communities, regions and topics.

The forum

California Speaks was designed as a non-partisan discussion about the major health insurance reforms in the state. Using neutral, accessible materials, a cross section of  Californians learned about the different options and voted during the forum about what the state should do. The options focused on issues concerning AB8 and, to a lesser degree, SB840. The product of the discussions will be presented to the Governor and legislative leadership to inform state legislation that is currently being negotiated in Sacramento.

The actual format of the discussions was that participants were divided into groups of 10–12 people, with a facilitator to make sure everyone got a chance to be heard. A discussion guide was provided which explained the background of the issues.

Each table reported its ideas using wireless computers and participants voted on the proposals, using a polling keypad. The entire group responded to the strongest themes generated from table discussions and voted on final recommendations to decision makers. Also, various local sessions across the state were in contact via interactive television simultaneously.

Results from the discussion were compiled into a report at the end of the meeting, and were given to participants, decision-makers and the media as the meeting concluded.

As a participant in the San Diego group, I don't understand the exclusion of every group throughout the state preferring a single party payee system to any of the choices offered for discussion. Those running the forum said that this choice had already been rejected by the state and we would not even be allowed to discuss or consider this as an option. The forum almost ended at that point as this is what the citizenry wanted.  The groups from Oakland and Humboldt counties were prepared to walk out if some version of a single party system wasn't included in the discussion. Our table was politically diverse in its make up, yet upon a straw vote ten of our twelve preferred some form of Medicare coverage for all.  Upon threat of there not being any discussion at all, we were allowed to consider how such a program would differ from the choices on the table, but nothing beyond that would be accepted.  I was a little stunned to hear groups of polar political differences in other issues be unified in their support of a health care system similar to the rest of the world's. Without my notes I can't report accurately on the remainder of the meeting, only that the participants had been muzzled and nobody had a chance to even discuss their opinions.

The results
Participants identified four key values to guide health care reform at the start of the forum: Health care should be affordable by all, everyone should have access, greed (profit) should not be part of the system, and wellness/prevention should be a priority. There was general support for the AB8/Governor’s range of proposals, with a number of conditions. Employer mandates were supported but most participants also wanted to assure that part-time and other employees were covered. Individual mandates were supported as long as there was an adequate standard for quality of care and other guarantees.  Over 80% of this cross-section of Californians expressed a willingness to “share the responsibility” for paying for expanded health insurance.

The impact

The results and interpretation were presented to representatives of the California Legislature and Governor on August 23, 2007. The intent of the process is that the opinions of this large (3,500 person) group of average Californians from around the state, who spent a full day discussing the issues, would inform the California health care reform debate.

See also
 AmericaSpeaks
 Medicare for All Act
 Universal health care

References

External links
 http://www.californiaspeaks.org/
 https://archive.today/20130414143111/http://www.calhealthreform.org/
 https://web.archive.org/web/20071009130315/http://www.cahealthreformnow.org/
 California OneCareNow Campaign
 Health Care for All—California
 Video Archive of CaliforniaSpeaks (in chapters) https://web.archive.org/web/20070929103347/http://www.fc-tv.com/clients/americaspeaks/webcast/
 Video Highlights (8-min) https://web.archive.org/web/20070929103253/http://www.fc-tv.com/FCVideo/CaliforniaSpeaks/caSpeaks5minlowres.wmv

Government of California
Citizens' assemblies
Healthcare reform in California